Serbs in Spain or Spanish Serbs, are Spanish citizens of Serb ethnic descent or Serbia-born people who reside in Spain. According to the 2008 census, there were 3,133 Serbian citizens in Spain. Current estimates suggest that there are 7,000 Serbs in Spain.

Notable people
Prince Peter of Yugoslavia, graphic designer and member of the Karađorđević dynasty
Radomir Antić, Serbian football manager
Miroslav Djukić, Serbian football manager
Arpad Sterbik, Serbia-born Spanish handball player
Bojan Krkić, Spanish football player
Sergej Milinković-Savić, Serbian footballer born in Lleida 
Vanja Milinković-Savić, Serbian footballer born in Ourense
Marko Pecarski, Serbian basketball player born in Gijón
Nikola Mirotić, Montenegro-born Spanish basketball player
Tristan Vukčević, Serbian-Swedish basketball player

See also 
 Serbia–Spain relations

References

External links
 Visit of Bishop Luka of Western Europe to Alicante

Spain
 
Spain
Serbian Orthodox Church in Spain